In statistics, the backfitting algorithm is a simple iterative procedure used to fit a generalized additive model. It was introduced in 1985 by Leo Breiman and Jerome Friedman along with generalized additive models. In most cases, the backfitting algorithm is equivalent to the Gauss–Seidel method, an algorithm used for solving a certain linear system of equations.

Algorithm
Additive models are a class of non-parametric regression models of the form:

 

The  represent unspecified smooth functions of a single . It is common to rectify this by constraining

  for all 

leaving

 

necessarily.

The backfitting algorithm is then:
    	
    Initialize ,
    Do until  converge:
        For each predictor j:
            (a)  (backfitting step)
            (b)  (mean centering of estimated function)

where  is our smoothing operator. This is typically chosen to be a cubic spline smoother but can be any other appropriate fitting operation, such as:

 local polynomial regression
 kernel smoothing methods
 more complex operators, such as surface smoothers for second and higher-order interactions

In theory, step (b) in the algorithm is not needed as the function estimates are constrained to sum to zero. However, due to numerical issues this might become a problem in practice.

Motivation
If we consider the problem of minimizing the expected squared error:

 

There exists a unique solution by the theory of projections given by:

 

for i = 1, 2, ..., p.

This gives the matrix interpretation:

 

where . In this context we can imagine a smoother matrix, which approximates our  and gives an estimate, of 

 

or in abbreviated form

 

An exact solution of this is infeasible to calculate for large np, so the iterative technique of backfitting is used. We take initial guesses  and update each  in turn to be the smoothed fit for the residuals of all the others:

 

Looking at the abbreviated form it is easy to see the backfitting algorithm as equivalent to the Gauss–Seidel method for linear smoothing operators S.

Explicit derivation for two dimensions

Following, we can formulate the backfitting algorithm explicitly for the two dimensional case. We have:

 

 

By induction we get

 

and

 

If we set  then we get
 

 

We have convergence if . In this case, letting :
 

 

Issues
The choice of when to stop the algorithm is arbitrary and it is hard to know a priori how long reaching a specific convergence threshold will take. Also, the final model depends on the order in which the predictor variables  are fit.

As well, the solution found by the backfitting procedure is non-unique. A modification of the backfitting algorithm involving projections onto the eigenspace of S can remedy this problem.

Modified algorithm
We can modify the backfitting algorithm to make it easier to provide a unique solution. Let  be the space spanned by all the eigenvectors of Si that correspond to eigenvalue 1. Then any b satisfying  has  and  Now if we take  to be a matrix that projects orthogonally onto , we get the following modified backfitting algorithm:

    Initialize ,, 
    Do until  converge:
        Regress  onto the space , setting 
        For each predictor j:
            Apply backfitting update to  using the smoothing operator , yielding new estimates for

References

External links
R Package for GAM backfitting
R Package for BRUTO backfitting

Numerical linear algebra
Generalized linear models